Ghali Club de Mascara or simply GC Mascara or simply GCM for short, is an Algerian football club located in Mascara, Algeria. The club was founded in 1925 and its colours are green and white. Their home stadium, The African Unity Stadium, has a capacity of 22,000 spectators. The club is currently playing in the Algerian Ligue 2.

History
The club was founded in 1925 in Mascara under the name of Galia Club de Mascara. It's one of the first Muslim teams in the French Algeria and was one of the important clubs before and after independence of the country.

The team was named Ghali Club de Mascara from 1962 to 1979 and from 1987 till now. It was also named Ghali Chabab Baladiat de Mascara (GCB Mascara) from 1977 to 1979 and Ghali Chabab Raï de Mascara (GCR Mascara) from 1979 to 1987.

Honours
Algerian Ligue 1
Champion (1) : 1984
Oran League
Champion (1) : 1951

Performance in CAF competitions
African Cup of Champions Clubs: 1 appearance
1985 – Quarter-final

Current squad

Notable players

Lakhdar Belloumi who is ranked amongst the top Algerian players of all time spent majority of his career with the club.

Below are the notable former players who have represented GC Mascara in league and international competition since the club's foundation in 1925. To appear in the section below, a player must have played in at least 100 official matches for the club or represented the national team for which the player is eligible during his stint with GC Mascara or following his departure.

For a complete list of GC Mascara players, see :Category:GC Mascara players.

References

Sources
 Team profile – competition.dz
 File of GC Mascara – sports.info
 GC Mascara fan website

 
Football clubs in Algeria
Association football clubs established in 1925
GC Mascara
1925 establishments in Algeria
Sports clubs in Algeria